John Edward McVay (January 5, 1931 – October 31, 2022) was an American football coach and executive. He rose through the coaching ranks from high school, through the college level, and to the National Football League (NFL). He played college football at Miami University in Ohio, starring as a center.

Early life
Born  in Bellaire, Ohio, McVay later moved to Massillon where he played high school football for Massillon Washington High School and was named second-team All-Ohio. McVay played college football at Miami University. He later married and had three boys, John, Jim, and Tim. His grandson, Sean McVay, son of Tim, is currently the head coach of the Los Angeles Rams.

McVay coached at several Ohio high schools, Michigan State University as an assistant coach, and then head coach at the University of Dayton.

Coaching career
McVay became the head coach of the World Football League Memphis Southmen (also known as the Memphis Grizzlies) in 1974, the WFL's first season. His record at Memphis was 24–7; the league folded in 1975. In 1976, he went to the NFL New York Giants as an assistant coach of research and development under fellow Miami alumnus Bill Arnsparger. After opening with seven losses, Arnsparger was fired in late October and McVay was promoted. From 1976 to 1978, McVay struggled with a franchise in transition. His first NFL season included a roster with three rookie quarterbacks. His contract with the Giants was not renewed after the 1978 season, most likely as the result of a famous loss to the Philadelphia Eagles on November 19.

Executive career
McVay moved on to an administrative position with the San Francisco 49ers in 1980. He collaborated with head coach Bill Walsh in one of the most successful dynasties in NFL history. As vice president/director of football operations, he presided over five Super Bowl-winning seasons. He was named NFL Executive of the Year in 1989. He retired from the 49ers in 1996. But when the franchise was transferred from Eddie DeBartolo Jr. to his sister, Denise, the York family wanted a steady hand like McVay's in the front office during the transition. McVay agreed to come back in 1998 and stayed for two more seasons.

Personal life and death
McVay's grandson, Sean, at the age of 30, became the youngest head coach in NFL history after he was hired by the Los Angeles Rams in 2017. Sean subsequently became the youngest head coach to win a Super Bowl when in 2022 he won  Super Bowl LVI.

McVay died on October 31, 2022, at the age of 91.

Head coaching record

College

Professional

References

External links
 Pro Football Reference profile
 

1931 births
2022 deaths
American football centers
Dayton Flyers athletic directors
Dayton Flyers football coaches
Memphis Southmen
Miami RedHawks football players
Michigan State Spartans football coaches
New York Giants head coaches
San Francisco 49ers executives
National Football League general managers
Memphis Southmen coaches
High school football coaches in Ohio
People from Bellaire, Ohio
Coaches of American football from Ohio
Players of American football from Ohio